Jack Tworkov (15 August 1900 – 4 September 1982) was an American abstract expressionist painter.

Early life and education
Yakov Tworkovsky, was born in Biała Podlaska on the border between Poland and the Russian Empire. His father was a tailor who immigrated to the United States in the early 1910s to set up the family tailoring business in New York City. In 1913, Tworkov, his mother, and younger sister travelled to New York through Ellis Island. Upon arriving to America, both children changed their names, Yakov became Jack, and his sister Schenehaia became Janice Biala. Tworkov enrolled in the American public school system. 

Tworkov was initially uninterested in painting and instead attended Columbia University to become a writer. His sister encouraged him to attend classes at the Art Students League of New York. The League proved influential for Tworkov's art career, sparking his interest in the field art. Two of his major influences early on were painters Cézanne and Matisse. Their influence along with his sisters prompted him to study art at the National Academy of Design and Art Students League of New York.

Career 
In 1924, he joined friends Yosl Cutler and Zuni Maud to be set and costume designers for Maurice Schwartz's production of Abraham Goldfaden's Di Kishefmacherin. They created puppets for the show and decided to launch a puppet theatre. The trio expanded their early work during a summer spent in the Catskills, at a summer home of left wing painters and writers, who offered opinions. In 1925 the trio opened the Modjacot (a portmanteau of their names) Spiel Theatre, the first Yiddish puppet theatre in America.  Tworkov dropped out, and the amalgam name became Modicot.

In 1929 America entered into the great depression; following the economic collapse President Franklin D. Roosevelt initiated the Work Projects Administration. Tworkov, being an aspiring artist, sought employment as a member of the Federal Art Project division of the Work Projects Administration met, which is where he met one of the first artists responsible for bring Abstract Expressionism to the attention of the American public, Willem de Kooning.  This is the time in which Tworkov's art begins to take on the early signs of Abstract Expressionism style.  Tworkov and de Koonig met many other abstract painters, and together with a group of abstract expressionists including Arshile Gorky, Mark Rothko and Jackson Pollock, founded the New York School.  Many of the people involved in creating the New York School including Tworkov were also involved with the creating of the 8th Street Club, which was responsible for hosting the 9th Street Art Exhibition, which was largely regarded as the event in which the New York School style was truly exposed to the American people.

During his lifetime, Tworkov taught at several institutions, including the American University, Black Mountain College, Queens College, Pratt Institute, University of Minnesota, Columbia University, and Yale University where he was the chairman of the Art Department from 1963 to 1969. As chairman, Tworkov invited known artists to teach, including Al Held, Knox Martin, George Wardlaw, and Bernard Chaet. Among the students of that era were Chuck Close, Jennifer Bartlett, Richard Serra, Nancy Graves, Rackstraw Downes, and Brice Marden.

Tworkov is regarded as an important and influential artist, along with Rothko, de Kooning, Philip Guston, Franz Kline, and Pollock, whose gestural paintings of the early 1950s formed the basis for the abstract expressionist movement in America. Major work from this period is characterized by the use of gestural brush strokes in flame-like color. His work transitioned during the mid-1960s. Straight lines and geometric patterns characterize his later art work. Wedding Flags of 1965, included in the Governor Nelson A. Rockefeller Empire State Plaza Art Collection in Albany, NY, is a transitional painting that combines both abstract expressionism and geometric abstraction.

Despite being credited as one of the founders of the New York School, Tworkov's later works of art diverged from this style of painting.  After the 1950s one can see from Tworkov's art that he takes a more geometric approach to his work; this is easily identifiable by his artwork specifically Indian Red Series #2 (1979).  Tworkov's experiments with geometric shapes were largely inspired by basic geometry and number systems, as well as the well known Fibonacci number sequence.

What was formerly the UBS Art Gallery in New York exhibited five decades of Tworkov's work in the 2009 show Against Extremes, "a tantalizing historical survey" charting everything from his de Kooning roots to his omnipresent "dream of freedom".

Tworkov died in 1982 in Provincetown, Massachusetts. He was 82.

See also
Art movement
Abstract expressionism
New York School
Action painting
Expressionism

References

 Brooklyn Rail, October 2009
Official Website for the Estate of Jack Tworkov
ART USA NOW Ed. by Lee Nordness;Vol.1, (The Viking Press, Inc., 1963.) pp. 90–93
Fred Laberge, "The Art of the Blues", Yale Alumni Magazine, May 1993
  Alexander Gray Associates
 Artnet

Catalogs
Edward Bryant; Jack Tworkov: Whitney Museum of American Art Publisher: Whitney Museum of American Art, NY ©1964. OCLC: 7607995
Jack Tworkov; Andrew Forge; Solomon R. Guggenheim Museum, Jack Tworkov, Fifteen Years of Painting : Solomon R. Guggenheim Museum, New York Publisher: Solomon R. Guggenheim Foundation, NY 1982. , 
 Richard Armstrong, Jack Tworkov : paintings 1928-1982 Publisher: Pennsylvania Academy of the Fine Arts, PA © 1987. 
 Elizabeth Frank; Andre Emmerich Gallery, New York, NY Jack Tworkov: Paintings from 1930 to 1981 © 1991.
Alston Conley; Boston College Museum of Art, Chestnut Hill, MA; Jack Tworkov 1935-1982: An Abstract Expressionist Inventing Form © 1994
Jack Tworkov;  Mitchell-Innes & Nash and Ameringer Howard Yohe Gallery, Jack Tworkov : red, white and blue Publisher: Mitchell-Innes & Nash : Ameringer/Howard/Yohe, 2002. , 
Debra Bricker Balken; Valerie Carberry Gallery, Chicago, IL Jack Tworkov: Early Paintings and Drawings © 2006.

External links
Jack Tworkov in the National Gallery of Australia's Kenneth Tyler Collection

1900 births
1982 deaths
20th-century American painters
American male painters
Abstract expressionist artists
American people of Polish-Jewish descent
Jewish American artists
Jewish painters
Polish emigrants to the United States
20th-century Polish painters
20th-century American male artists
Art Students League of New York alumni
20th-century American printmakers
Polish male painters
20th-century American Jews